The Lambert Puppet Theatre & Museum was a puppet theatre located in Monkstown, County Dublin, Ireland. It was a family-run business established in 1972 by Eugene Lambert, and hosted an international puppet festival annually. It produced children's television series on Radio Telefís Éireann such as Wanderly Wagon.

After the death of Eugene Lambert, the theatre was run by his son, Liam. On August 28, 2015, the building was badly damaged in an arson attack, which caused damage with a cost in excess of €150,000.

On 13 November 2015, the theatre re-opened to the public with re-built puppets, for the Christmas performance of Aladdin, however this re-opening was not to last, and it closed permanently in 2018.

References

External links
Puppet theatre's website

Puppet theaters
Theatres in Dublin (city)
Monkstown, Dublin
1972 establishments in Ireland
2018 disestablishments in Ireland